Ludwig Franz Benedikt Biermann (March 13, 1907 in  Hamm – January 12, 1986 in München) was a German astronomer, obtaining his Ph.D. from Göttingen University in 1932.

He made important contributions to astrophysics and plasma physics, discovering the Biermann battery. He predicted the existence of the solar wind which in 1947 he dubbed "solar corpuscular radiation".

He was a visiting scholar at the Institute for Advanced Study in the fall of 1961. He won the Bruce Medal in 1967 and the Gold Medal of the Royal Astronomical Society in 1974.

Asteroid 73640 Biermann is named in his honor.

References

External links
 Bruce medal page

Awards
 Awarding of Bruce Medal
 Awarding of RAS gold medal

Obituaries
 MitAG 66 (1986) 10 
 QJRAS 27 (1986) 698

1907 births
1986 deaths
People from Hamm
20th-century German astronomers
Max Planck Society people
Institute for Advanced Study visiting scholars
People from the Province of Westphalia
Recipients of the Gold Medal of the Royal Astronomical Society
Foreign associates of the National Academy of Sciences
Max Planck Institute directors